Joris, a Dutch form of the given name George, may refer to:
Joris Bado (born 1991),  Burkinabé basketball player
Joris Bert (born 1987), French baseball player
Joris Borghouts (born 1939), Dutch Egyptologist
Joris Delle (born 1990), French football player
Joris De Loore (born 1993), Belgian tennis player
Joris de Man (born 1972), Dutch composer
Joris Gorendiawé (born 1990), New Caledonian football player
Joris Harteveld (born 1968), Namibian racing cyclist
Joris Hendrickx (born 1983), Belgian sidecarcross rider
Joris Hoefnagel (1542–1601), Flemish painter, printmaker
Joris Ivens (1898–1989), Dutch documentary filmmaker
Joris Jarsky (born 1974), Canadian actor
Joris Jehan (born 1989), French football player
Joris Kayembe (born 1994), Belgian football player
Joris Keizer (born 1979), Dutch swimmer
Joris Luyendijk (born 1971), Dutch correspondent, writer
Joris Marveaux (born 1982), French football player
Joris Mathijsen (born 1980), Dutch football player
Joris Note (born 1949), Belgian writer
Joris Pijs (born 1987), Dutch rower
Joris Poort (born 1983), American businessman
Joris Putman (born 1984), Dutch actor
Joris Sainati (born 1988), French football player
Joris Tjebbes (1929–2001), Dutch swimmer
Joris Vanspringel (born 1963), Belgian eventing rider
Joris Vanvinckenroye (born 1977), Belgian musician and composer
Joris Van Hauthem (1963–2015), Belgian politician
Joris Van Hout (born 1977), Belgian footballer
Joris van Schooten (1587–1651), Dutch painter
Joris Van Severen (1894–1940), Belgian politician
Joris van Soerland (born 1972), Dutch badminton player
Joris van Son (1623–1667), Flemish painter
Joris van Spilbergen (1568–1620), Dutch naval officer
Joris van der Haagen (c.1615–1669), Dutch painter
Joris Vercammen (born 1952), Dutch bishop
Joris Voorhoeve (born 1945), Dutch politician
Joris Voorn (born 1977), Dutch DJ
Joris-Karl Huysmans (1848–1907), French novelist

Other uses
JORis
Joris of the Rock, fantasy novel

See also
Sjors (another Dutch version of the name George)

George (disambiguation)

Dutch masculine given names